Pine Township is an inactive township in Ripley County, in the U.S. state of Missouri.

Pine Township was erected in 1890, and named after the community of Pine, Missouri.

References

Townships in Missouri
Townships in Ripley County, Missouri